Mousa Abu Jazar (born 25 August 1987) is a Palestinian footballer who plays as a defender for West Bank League club Shabab Al-Khaleel and the Palestine national team.

International goals

Honours

National team
AFC Challenge Cup: 2014

References

External links

1987 births
Living people
Palestinian footballers
Association football defenders
Palestine international footballers
Shabab Rafah players
Hilal Al-Quds Club players
Shabab Al-Khalil SC players
West Bank Premier League players
2015 AFC Asian Cup players
Footballers at the 2006 Asian Games
Asian Games competitors for Palestine